The 1925–26 Irish Cup was the 46th edition of the premier knock-out cup competition in Northern Irish football. 

Belfast Celtic won the tournament for the 2nd time, defeating Linfield 3–2 in the final at Solitude.

Results

First round

|}

Replay

|}

Second replay

|}

Quarter-finals

|}

Replay

|}

Semi-finals

|}

Replay

|}

Second replay

|}

Final

References

External links
 Northern Ireland Cup Finals. Rec.Sport.Soccer Statistics Foundation (RSSSF)

Irish Cup seasons
1925–26 domestic association football cups
1925–26 in Northern Ireland association football